Fanta Sy (born 2 November 1991) is a Senegalese footballer who plays as a forward for Sirènes Grand Yoff and the Senegal women's national team.

International career
Sy capped for Senegal at senior level during the 2016 Africa Women Cup of Nations qualification.

References

External links

1991 births
Living people
Women's association football forwards
Senegalese women's footballers
Senegal women's international footballers